Pineault is a surname that originates from France. Notable people with the surname include:

 Adam Pineault (born 1986), American ice hockey player
 Alicia Pineault (born 1999), Canadian figure skater

See also
 Pinault
 Pineau, French aperitif

Surnames of French origin